Petoro is a company that is wholly owned by the Government of Norway. Established in 2001, it manages the Government's portfolio—collectively called State's Direct Financial Interest (SDFI)—of exploration and production licenses for petroleum and natural gas on the Norwegian continental shelf. The company also has a control function surveying Equinor's production on behalf of the Government. Petoro is not an operator of any fields and does not directly own the licenses.

In 2021, Petoro was ranked no. 33 out of 120 oil, gas, and mining companies involved in resource extraction north of the Arctic Circle in the Arctic Environmental Responsibility Index (AERI).

References

External links 

Petoro.no: official Petoro website

 
Government-owned companies of Norway
Ministry of Petroleum and Energy
Companies based in Stavanger
Energy companies established in 2001
Non-renewable resource companies established in 2001
Government agencies established in 2001
2001 establishments in Norway
Petroleum in Norway